In mathematics, in the field of topology, a topological space  is said to be collectionwise Hausdorff if given any closed discrete subset of , there is a pairwise disjoint family of open sets with each point of the discrete subset contained in exactly one of the open sets. 

Properties 
 Every T1 space that is collectionwise Hausdorff is also Hausdorff.

 Every collectionwise normal space is collectionwise Hausdorff.

 Metrizable spaces are collectionwise normal and hence collectionwise Hausdorff.

Remarks

References 

Topology
Properties of topological spaces